John Rost (born ) is a former British ice hockey player. He played between 1962 and 1982 for the Brighton Tigers, Wembley Lions and Streatham Redskins. He was inducted to the British Ice Hockey Hall of Fame in 1991.

During his time with Streatham, Rost also coached and managed the team at various times. He became a member of the British Ice Hockey Association in 1976 and has managed both the Great Britain senior and junior teams.

Rost is the son of fellow British Ice Hockey Hall of Famer Clarence Rost and he is the father of former player Warren Rost.

External links

1944 births
Brighton Tigers players
British Ice Hockey Hall of Fame inductees
English ice hockey defencemen
Living people
Wembley Lions players